Jan van Assen, who was born at Amsterdam in 1635, was a painter of history, portraits, and landscape, in the Italian manner; he studied particularly the works of Tempesta. He died at his birthplace in 1695.

References
 

1635 births
1695 deaths
Painters from Amsterdam
Dutch Golden Age painters
Dutch male painters